Mehmet Ali Has (1 January 1927 – 28 March 1982) was a Turkish footballer who played as a forward and was best known for his stints at
Fenerbahçe and Beykoz in the Turkish Süper Lig. He was nicknamed Tarzan Mehmet Ali because of his long hair.

Personal life
Has' brother, Şeref Has, was also a Turkish professional footballer.

References

External links
 
 

1927 births
1982 deaths
Footballers from Istanbul
Turkish footballers
Turkey international footballers
Turkey youth international footballers
Fenerbahçe S.K. footballers
Alibeyköyspor footballers
Süper Lig players
Association football forwards